Brigadier Edward Percy Noel Jones,  (24 December 1896 – 6 April 1988) was a British Army  officer who served as acting General Officer Commanding 1st Armoured Division during the Second World War.

Military career
Jones was commissioned into the Royal Artillery on 27 October 1915. He saw action during the First World War for which he was awarded the Military Cross and a bar to the Military Cross.

Remaining in the British Army during the interwar period, he attended the Staff College, Quetta from 1932 to 1933.

During the Second World War, he served as Director Royal Artillery for 1st Armoured Division in North Africa and briefly served as acting General Officer Commanding 1st Armoured Division on five separate occasions: from 18 February 1944 to 29 February 1944, from 14 March 1944 to 19 March 1944, from 24 March 1944 to 27 March 1944, from 10 April 1944 to 15 April 1944 and from 27 April 1944 to 10 May 1944. After the war he served as Brigadier, Royal Artillery in India from January 1946 to September 1946.

References

External links
Generals of World War II

1896 births
1988 deaths
Royal Artillery officers
Recipients of the Military Cross
British Army personnel of World War I
British Army brigadiers of World War II
Graduates of the Staff College, Quetta
War Office personnel in World War II